Ripley St Thomas Church of England Academy is a mixed Church of England high school operating under academy status, in the city of Lancaster in the north west of England. The school has over 1700 pupils between 11 and 18 years old, 350 of whom are part of the sixth form.

History 
The school started life as Ripley Hospital, founded by Julia, wife of Thomas Ripley, a merchant who traded out of Lancaster and Liverpool. Thomas Ripley was born in Lancaster in 1791, and had been an apprentice to a grocer and linen draper. Since his mercantile career began later than 1807, whether Thomas Ripley was associated with the slave trade is open to speculation as the slave trade was not fully abolished in Britain until 1833. It is highly likely that he was involved due to the nature of his mercantile work and how commonplace slave trading was during this era.

Indeed, much of his wealth stems from the fact that he was one of the first English merchants to embark on trade with China, and much of his subsequent trade was with the East Indies. As a devout Christian, he was keen to establish a charity hospital, modelled on the Liverpool Blue Coat School. Having no children, on his death in 1852 he left a considerable sum of money in trust to establish the Ripley Hospital to cater for fatherless children, especially those whose fathers had been lost at sea.

The main school building, originally costing £30,000, included a first class gym, woodwork and metalwork rooms, a domestic school for girls, and heated swimming pool, four courts for playing fives and enough full-sized football pitches to allow 150 boys to play at the same time. A farm of some  kept the school supplied with home produced meat, milk and poultry, and a vast kitchen garden gave a constant supply of fresh vegetables. This school was well in advance of its time. The farm won awards for the quality of its meat.

The work of the hospital continued until the outbreak of World War II in 1939, when the building was requisitioned by the army. The pupils then moved out to Capernwray Hall. They expected to return at the end of the war, but the government requisitioned Ripley for another three years for use as an emergency teachers' training college.

By then, it was realised that the need for an endowed orphanage was much reduced. State pensions allowed more one parent families to stay together, and the fashion had moved away from institutional units. After the trainee teachers left, the building became a National School, then a boys' secondary modern school until 1966 when Ripley Boys' and St. Thomas Girls' Schools amalgamated to become Ripley St. Thomas Church of England School.

In September 1996, Ripley was designated a Language College. Whilst not changing in any way its status as a Voluntary Aided Church School, this does enable the school to develop its language facilities and so become a 'Centre of Excellence' for modern languages, including French, German, Spanish, Japanese, Chinese, Malaysian and Arabic.

Today 
Today, 1650 boys and girls are educated at the school, many of whom continue to the age of 18 years and go on to complete university degree courses. The current headteacher is Catherine Walmsley, who replaced Liz Nicholls, who was appointed CEO of The Bay Learning Trust in July 2017. She arrived at Ripley in April 2006, after four years at St Michael's, Chorley. Martin Wood announced his resignation on 31 January 2019, taking effect on Easter of that year.

Recent additions include science laboratories, a Language and Technology block housing classroom space, sports hall with full-size basketball courts, classrooms and fitness suite, and Sixth Form Centre. Ripley has also upgraded the technology, language and mathematics classrooms.

The farm has been the subject of media attention, with features from BBC North West Tonight, BBC Songs of Praise and Newsround, all of which praised the school on the 'Farm to Fork' initiative, as the farm provides produce for the school kitchen. The school appeared on CBBC's Blue Peter on 6 September 2012, with the programme also focusing on the 'Farm to Fork' initiative.

The school raised enough money to build a new multi-million-pound sixth form centre, which opened in January 2009, complete with lecture and conference facilities. Since doing so, numbers in the sixth form have increased.

Ripley St Thomas has also been as approved a Technology college, adding to the Language status. This means students must take at least one language and at least one technology course, e.g. Food Technology or Mechanical Technology at GCSE, continuing the curriculum students experience from Year 7. Ripley has gained many specialisms, including Training School, National Support School and member of the Leading Edge Partnership Programme, providing support to other schools in the area.

In January 2012, an Ofsted report rated the school overall as "Outstanding", the highest of four achievable Ofsted grades. The grade of "Outstanding" was also assigned in all 33 of the areas assessed by Ofsted.

In 2017, the Music Department was awarded the Music Teacher Awards for Excellence's award for Best School Music Department.

GCSE and A level results
Ripley St Thomas achieves outstanding results for GCSE and A level students every year, far outweighing the local authority and national average.  The results for 5 or more A* to C including English and Maths has risen from 85% in 2010, to 89% in 2011, 31% higher than the national average.

Sixth form 
In 2009, the sixth form at Ripley St Thomas moved into a new multi-million pound complex. Complete with lecture and conference facilities, the sixth form centre serves sixth formers and outsiders looking to host events.

Academy status onwards 
On Sunday 1 May 2011, Ripley St Thomas became the third high school in Lancaster to be granted Academy status by the Secretary of State, and was re-designated as "Ripley St Thomas Church of England Academy". The company has been registered with Companies House and an Academy Trust has been set up to run the company.

See also
Ripley School Chapel

References 

Schools in Lancaster, Lancashire
Educational institutions established in 1864
Paley and Austin buildings
Church of England secondary schools in the Diocese of Blackburn
Secondary schools in Lancashire
Training schools in England
Academies in Lancashire
1864 establishments in England